Ibrahim Hassan (born 12 February 1971) is a Ghanaian former sprinter who competed in the 1996 Summer Olympics.

References

1971 births
Living people
Ghanaian male sprinters
Olympic athletes of Ghana
Athletes (track and field) at the 1994 Commonwealth Games
Athletes (track and field) at the 1996 Summer Olympics
UCLA Bruins men's track and field athletes
World Athletics Championships athletes for Ghana
Commonwealth Games competitors for Ghana
Universiade medalists in athletics (track and field)
Universiade medalists for Ghana
African Games medalists in athletics (track and field)
African Games gold medalists for Ghana
Athletes (track and field) at the 1995 All-Africa Games
Medalists at the 1993 Summer Universiade
20th-century Ghanaian people
21st-century Ghanaian people